2014 Regional League Division 2 Northern Region is the sixth season of the League competition since its establishment in 2009. It is in the third tier of the Thai football league system.

Changes from last season

Team changes

Promoted clubs

Chiangmai and Phitsanulok were promoted to the 2014 Thai Division 1 League.

Renamed clubs

 Tak renamed Tak United.

Stadium and locations

League table

References

External links
 Football Association of Thailand

Regional League Northern Division seasons